The Last Alarm is a 1940 American crime film directed by William Beaudine and starring veteran character actor J. Farrell MacDonald.

Plot 

Captain Jim Hadley, fire chief, has his retirement dinner after 40 years in the service. The next day, time hangs very heavy on his hands so that he even chats to a brush salesman (who has a perfect Elmer Fudd voice). Bored, he later visits his old fire station, Fire Company No.7, and talks to the men there, who are called out on a fire.

The Great Eastern Insurance Company is where Frank Rogers (who is interested in Hadley’s daughter Jane) works. There have been a number of fires lately and arson is suspected. This thought is echoed at the Arson Bureau where Lieutenant King, chased up by the mayor, tells Henderson and Roberts he wants results. They know it is an arsonist who uses time bombs and gasoline. The arsonist turns out to be the keeper of an antiques shop, which Joan visits.

Jim is making plans for the future with Burt Stafford, who is due to retire soon. Burt is called out on a fire with the others and is very badly injured there. He dies in the hospital, with Jim standing beside him. The antiques man has called at the Hadley home to bring a salt and pepper set he had to do minor work on, which Joan had bought. She sees the gleam in his eyes when she lights a match.

Jim joins the arson investigation at the bureau, having had some experience when he was in the fire brigade. Spectroscopic analysis of wood found at the scene of the last big fire reveals that part of the burnt time bomb box Jim found was maple wood, so he, Henderson and Roberts scour the city for the maker of the boxes and who they sold them to.

At another big fire, Jim comes across a statue of Vulcan (the Roman god of fire) which the arsonist dropped, it being his inspiration. The arsonist gets it from Jim’s unlocked car where he put it. Mention of this statue later—and the fact that Frank and Joan saw it in the antique shop window—provide a strong lead so they get a search warrant. They do not find any bomb-making equipment, but Jim finds wood shavings which later analysis reveals to be the same wood as that used for the time bomb box.

Jim and Frank go after the arsonist, who has lost his bureau tail. The arsonist goes to the basement of the Hadley house where he plants a time bomb. He goes upstairs and confronts Mrs. Hadley and Joan, and as Jim and Frank realize he may be back at their house—having been seen in the vicinity—the bomb goes off and the basement catches fire. The arsonist tells the women Jim should not have interfered in his work. The men bust in the door and while Frank escorts the women outside, Jim goes after the arsonist, who now babbling about being the god of fire. The arsonist falls down the basement steps into the burning basement and dies. Some time later there is another dinner in honor of Jim, who has got a new job—honorary fire chief of the city.

The film contained footage from a number of large authentic fires, a fire station, and firemen rushing to the fires and fighting the fires. No acknowledgment was given to the fire service. The unnamed city was Los Angeles as it was filmed at Fire Station 27 in Hollywood.

Cast 
J. Farrell MacDonald as Jim Hadley
Polly Ann Young as Joan Hadley
Warren Hull as Frank Rogers
George Pembroke as Wendell
Mary Gordon as Mrs Hadley
Joel Friedkin as Burt Stafford
Bruce MacFarlane as Jack Henderson
Eddie Hart as Dick Roberts
Willard Hall as Briggs
Charles Anthony Hughes Lieutenant King
Charles R. Phipps as Stevens
Eddie Kane as Fire Chief
James Coughlin as Cummings
Mike Mazurki as an onlooker (uncredited)

External links 

1940 films
1940s English-language films
American black-and-white films
1940 crime films
Monogram Pictures films
Films about arson
Films about firefighting
American crime films
Films directed by William Beaudine
1940s American films
Films shot in Los Angeles